Mount Laojun may refer to:

 Mount Laojun (Henan), Henan, China
 Mount Laojun (Yunnan), Yunan, China